Scott L. Delp, Ph.D., is the James H. Clark Professor of Bioengineering and Mechanical Engineering at Stanford University.  He is the Founding Chairman of the Department of Bioengineering at Stanford, the Director of the National Center for Simulation in Rehabilitation Research (NCSRR), Simbios, the NIH Center for Physics-Based Simulations of Biological Structures at Stanford., and the Mobilize Center, a data science research center focused on mobile health.

Delp transformed the field of biomechanics by creating highly accurate computer models of musculoskeletal structures and providing them to researchers worldwide using a software system he and his team developed (OpenSim). Delp's software has become the basis of an international collaboration involving thousands of investigators who exchange biomechanical models using OpenSim. Delp invented fundamental technology for surgical navigation that is now in wide clinical use. Together with Mark Schnitzer and their students, Delp developed novel microendoscopes that allow realtime in vivo imaging of human muscle microstructure.  Together with Karl Deisseroth, Delp pioneered the use of optogenetics to control activity in the peripheral nervous system leading to important inventions for treating paralysis, spasticity and pain. He has co-founded several companies, including Musculographics (now Motion Analysis Corp), Surgical Graphics (acquired by Medtronic), Cala Health, Zebra Medical Technologies, and Circuit Therapeutics.

Education
 Ph.D.: Stanford University, Mechanical Engineering (1990)
 M.S.: Stanford University, Mechanical Engineering (1986)
 B.S.:	Colorado State University, Mechanical Engineering (1983), summa cum laude

Selected awards
Delp was elected as a member into the National Academy of Engineering in 2016 for computer simulations of human movement and their applications to treatment of clinical movement pathologies. He is also a Fellow, American Institute of Medical and Biological Engineers, American Society of Biomechanics, and American Society of Mechanical Engineers.

He has received major awards, including the Giovanni Borelli Award from the American Society of Biomechanics, awarded annually to an individual investigator for exemplary research; the Van. C. Mow Medal from the American Society of Mechanical Engineers, bestowed upon a single individual each year who has made significant contributions to the field of bioengineering, and the
Maurice E. Muller Award for Excellence in Computer Assisted Surgery, recognizing career-long achievements that fundamentally advance the field.  He received the David Morgenthaler Faculty Scholar Award, the National Young Investigator Award, National Science Foundation, and was honored at White House by President Clinton for technology innovation.

References

External links
 National Center for Simulation in Rehabilitation Research (NCSRR)
 NIH Center for Biomedical Computation at Stanford (Simbios)
 Professor Delp’s Stanford faculty page
 Neuromuscular Biomechanics Lab (NMBL) - Stanford University
 Scott Delp – Google Scholar

Colorado State University alumni
Stanford University alumni
Fellows of the American Society of Mechanical Engineers
Stanford University faculty
Living people
Fellows of the American Institute for Medical and Biological Engineering
Year of birth missing (living people)